Takht-e Foulad is a historical cemetery in Isfahan, Iran. The cemetery is at least 800 years old. In the 13th century in the Ilkhanid era Takht-e Foulad was the most important cemetery in Isfahan and all of the famous personalities have a mausoleum in this cemetery. Unfortunately all of the mausoleums from the Ilkhanid era, except Baba Rokn ed-Din mausoleum, which is the oldest structure in Takht-e Foulad, have been destroyed. In the Safavid era there were 400 mausoleums in Takht-e Foulad, but there are now only 8 mausoleums from the Safavid era. In the Qajar era a large part of the cemetery was destroyed, but the cemetery hasn't lost its importance and by the end of Pahlavi era it was the most important cemetery in Isfahan. There are 20 structures from the Qajar era and 17 structures from the Pahlavi era in the cemetery. Before the Safavid age the cemetery had been known as Lessan ol-Arz and Baba Rokn ed-Din, but from the Safavid age until now its name is Takht-e Foulad.

By the demand of people authorities have established Takht-e Foulad Cultural and Religious Complex in 1994 for rebuilding, organizing, and repairing this valuable cemetery. Since 1994, many gravestones have been repaired and rebuilt by this institution.

The best days for visiting the cemetery are Thursdays and Fridays, because the most of mausoleums are open for visitors.

Most important places in Takht-e Foulad

Baba Rokn ed-Din mausoleum 
Although Baba Rokn ed-Din was a high ranking Baba in the 14th century, but there are few information about his life and works. The construction of the current building started in the era of Abbas I and was completed in the era of Safi.

Valeh mausoleum 
Valeh Esfahani was a poet and calligrapher in Isfahan during the reign of Fath-Ali Shah. He died in 1814 and a mausoleum was built on his grave.

Mir section 
Many notabilities habe been buried in Takht-e Foulad. One of them is Mir Fendereski, the famous mystic and scholar in the Safavid era. His grave has been covered by a single large piece of marble stone. On the stone, the date of the Islamic calendar has been written, which is equal to 1640 in the Gregorian calendar. In a room next to the grave, a ghazal of Hafez (in Nastaliq script) has been made with stucco by Mir Emad, the famous calligrapher in the Safavid era. It is the only inscription by Mir Emad, which has been written on the wall of a building.

Beside the Mir section and in the mausoleum of the leaders of Bakhtiari tribe, there is a painting, which shows Shaykh Bahai, Mir Fendereski and a lion.

Agha Hossein Khansari mausoleum 
Agha Hossein Khansari was a very influential scientist in the court of Suleiman I. His mausoleum was the only mausoleum, which was built for a scientist.

Mohammad Jafar Abadei Tekyeh 
The Mohammad Jafar Abadei Tekyeh belongs to the Qajar era and is located to the south of Roknolmolk mosque.

References 

Cemeteries in Iran
Buildings and structures in Isfahan
Tourist attractions in Isfahan
Takht-e Foulad